John Johnstone (23 January 1869 – 6 February 1953) was a Scottish footballer who played as a left half for Kilmarnock and Scotland. He played in the 1898 Scottish Cup Final which Kilmarnock lost to Rangers, and was a winner of Scottish Division Two in the same season and again in 1898–99 (they were elected for promotion on the second occasion).

References

Sources

External links

London Hearts profile

1869 births
1953 deaths
Scottish footballers
Association football wing halves
Scotland international footballers
Kilmarnock F.C. players
Footballers from Kilmarnock
Scottish Football League players